Kosovo Energy Corporation J.S.C. (abbreviated as KEK) is a company based in Kosovo engaged in generation of electricity and allied activities. Its capacity is estimated to be around 1480+ MW.

History 

On 6 June 2014, the Kosovo Energy Corporation Kosovo A Power Station exploded killing two people and injuring 13 others. The station was then subsequently shut down. The cause of the explosion was due to the explosion of hydrogen tank located in a separate part of the power station from the generator.

Capacity 
Total electricity produced locally by Kosovo Energy Corporation

See also 

 Electrical energy in Kosovo
 KOSTT
 Kosovo Electricity Distribution and Supply

References

External links 

 

Kosovo companies
Electric power companies of Europe